Lešok is a village in the municipality of Tearce, North Macedonia.

History
According to a 1467-68 Ottoman defter, the inhabitants of Lešok exhibited mostly Albanian and mixed Slavic-Albanian anthroponymy the latter usually consisting of a Slavic first name and an Albanian last name (Radič, son of Gjin Arbanasi, Radivoj, son of Doda), while a minority carried traditional Slavic anthroponymy. The settlement had two Orthodox Albanian priests who served in the Slavic-speaking church.

This village is well known for its monastery, where operated the Macedonian Bulgarian intellectual Kiril Pejcinović.

In statistics gathered by Vasil Kanchov in 1900, the village was inhabited by 540 Bulgarian Exarchists.

Demographics
According to the 2002 census, the village had a total of 440 inhabitants. Ethnic groups in the village include:

Macedonians 435
Serbs 1
Others 4

References

Villages in Tearce Municipality